Sandnes-mål, Sandnes dialect or Sandnes Norwegian (Bokmål: Sandnes-mål or Sandnesdialekten) is a dialect of Norwegian used in Sandnes.

Phonology

Consonants
 Between and after vowels, the voiceless plosives  are realized as voiced .
  merges with  into .
  is uvular.

Vowels

 The close vowels  are rather lax (near-close) .
 The unrounded–rounded pairs  have a very similar backness, and differ mainly by rounding.
  are mid , whereas  are open-mid .
  are near-open; the long vowel is central , whereas the short vowel is somewhat more front .

References

Bibliography

Further reading

External links

 

Culture in Rogaland
Norwegian dialects